Ringsheim/Europa-Park station is a railway station in Ringsheim, Germany on the Mannheim–Karlsruhe–Basel railway. It is the closest railway station to Europa-Park and shuttle buses carry passengers the  distance to the park. 

The name of the station was changed from Ringsheim to Ringsheim/Europa-Park in December 2021.

On 20 September 2022, it was announced that TGV services would start calling at the station. The planned service will start on 11 December 2022 and will see services from Paris to Ringsheim/Europa-Park on Fridays and Saturdays, and a return service on Sundays.

Services
 Rail services in the 2023 timetable

Long distance services

Regional services

References 

Railway stations in Baden-Württemberg